Helmut Gude (23 November 1925 – 3 February 2001) was a German steeplechase runner. He competed in the men's 3000 metres steeplechase at the 1952 Summer Olympics finishing eight. Gude was the first German under 8:50.0 minutes in the steeplechase in 1952.

Gude became German national 3000 metres steeplechase champion in 1951 and 1952. He won the national cross-country championships in 1953 and was runner-up in 1954.

Gude emigrated to the United States in 1954. He became a carpenter.

References

External links
 

1925 births
2001 deaths
Athletes (track and field) at the 1952 Summer Olympics
German male steeplechase runners
German male middle-distance runners
Olympic athletes of Germany
Place of birth missing
German emigrants to the United States
People from Düren
Sportspeople from Cologne (region)
20th-century German people